The noise reduction coefficient (commonly abbreviated NRC) is a single number value ranging from 0.0 to 1.0 that describes the average sound absorption performance of a material. An NRC of 0.0 indicates the object does not attenuate mid-frequency sounds, but rather reflects sound energy. This is more conceptual than physically achievable: even very thick concrete walls will attenuate sound and may have an NRC of 0.05. Conversely, an NRC of 1.0 indicates that the material provides an acoustic surface area (in units sabin) that is equivalent to its physical, two-dimensional surface area. This rating is common of thicker, porous sound absorptive materials such as 2"-thick fabric-wrapped fiberglass panel. Materials can achieve NRC values greater than 1.00. This is a shortcoming of the test procedure and a limitation of how acousticians define a square unit of absorption, and not a characteristic of the material itself.

Technical definition
The noise reduction coefficient is the arithmetic average, rounded to the nearest multiple of 0.05, of the absorption coefficients for a specific material and mounting condition determined at the octave band center frequencies of 250, 500, 1000 and 2000 Hz.  The absorption coefficients of materials are commonly determined through use of standardized testing procedures, such as ASTM C423 that is used to evaluate the absorption of materials in eighteen one-third octave frequency bands with center frequencies ranging from 100 Hz to 5000 Hz. Absorption coefficients used to calculate NRC are commonly determined in reverberation rooms of qualified acoustical laboratory test facilities using samples of the particular materials of specified size (typically  in an  configuration) and appropriate mounting.

The NRC is a logarithmic representation of the decay rate (dB/s) due to a panel or object with a defined surface area absorbing energy compared to the decay rate in a standard reverberant room without the panel or object

History  
Wallace Clement Sabine was the first scientist to study the sound-absorbing characteristics of materials in a scientifically rigorous manner. Paul Sabine, a distant cousin of Wallace, studied the repeatability of sound absorption coefficient measurements in reverberation chambers. Paul Sabine's work in the 1920s–1930s laid the groundwork for the ASTM C423 test methodology still used today.

Prior to the development of a standard procedure for material testing or reverberation chamber construction, data at low frequencies was highly unreliable and differed significantly from manufacturer to manufacturer. This is one of the primary reasons why the noise reduction coefficient historically did not include the value at 125Hz (128Hz at the time).

Factors affecting noise reduction coefficient

Mounting type 
The NRC is highly dependent on the type of mounting, which, if not specified, is usually a Type A mounting (ABPMA mounting #4) where the material is placed directly on the floor, wall, or ceiling.

Acoustical ceiling tiles are often tested in Type E400 mounting, which simulates a 16 inch-deep plenum. This deeper airspace typically boosts the low frequency performance of the tile, but may not impact the NRC rating (since the NRC does not include the 125Hz octave band).

Sample size 
There's potential for greater error or overemphasizing the acoustic efficacy of a material if tested sample sizes are smaller than the standardized 8ft x 9ft modules. The perimeter-to-area ratio has a significant effect on the overall sound absorption of a material, and may effect the NRC.

Thickness 
Thicker samples of the same material often absorb more sound and are better at absorbing lower in frequency. Thicker materials also have larger surface area at the sides, resulting in increased sound absorption due to edge effects.

Applications
NRC is most commonly used to rate general acoustical properties of acoustic ceiling tiles, baffles, banners, office screens, and acoustic wall panels.  It is occasionally used to rate floor coverings.

NRC is intended to be a simplified acoustical rating of room construction and finish materials when the acoustical objectives of the space are less than sensitive. The NRC average is rounded to the nearest 0.05 due to a typical lab repeatability of ±0.05 for 2 standard deviations. Reproducibility between different labs is roughly three times higher at ±0.15 for 2 standard deviations. NRC is a useful rating for general purpose rooms where speech noise build-up is the major concern: lobbies, open offices, reception areas, etc. In certain applications, such as designs of music rehearsal rooms, performance spaces, and rooms employed for critical speech, it is usually more appropriate to consider the sound absorption coefficients at the individual one-third octave band frequencies, including those above and below the bands used to compute NRC.

When evaluating the NRC of similar materials, the following table can be used to approximate whether there's an aural difference:

New standards
NRC is being replaced by the Sound Absorption Average (SAA), which is described in the 1999 and newer versions of the ASTM C423 standard.  The SAA is a single-number rating of sound absorption properties of a material identical to NRC, except that twelve one-third octave measurements from 200 Hz to 2500 Hz are used, inclusive, instead of just four in a smaller range and rounding is to the nearest multiple of 0.01 instead of 0.05 due to improved repeatability from averaging more points. Given that the SAA averages more points over a slightly larger range, the SAA can be a better indicator of low frequency sound absorption performance.

References

Acoustics